Tiempos de dictadura is a 2012 Venezuelan documentary film written and directed by , narrated by humorist and politologist Laureano Márquez. The film focuses on the dictatorship of Marcos Pérez Jiménez.

Plot 
The documentary narrates the period of the dictatorship of Marcos Pérez Jiménez, from the 1948 coup d'état against President Rómulo Gallegos and the human rights violations committed by the Seguridad Nacional secret police (including censorship, arrests, torture and extrajudicial killings) to the public works and lavish carnivals promoted by the oil boom.

Release 
The film was screened in Venezuela on 7 September 2012. Oteyza declared that he was aiming to screen the documentary on 23 January, the anniversary when Pérez Jiménez was overthrown, but it was not possible due to the production time.

See also 

 CAP 2 Intentos
 El pueblo soy yo
Rómulo Resiste

References

External links 
 
 Tiempos de dictadura at FilmAffinity
 #Documental -Tiempos de dictadura, tiempos de Marcos Pérez Jiménez at YouTube

2012 documentary films
2012 films
2010s Spanish-language films
Venezuelan documentary films
Documentary films about Venezuela